Tula Uma is an Indian politician from Bharatiya Janata Party (BJP) from the state of Telangana. She is the first woman ZP chairperson of Karimnagar District and the state mahila president of the Telangana Rashtra Samithi (TRS), a state party in India. She is a ZPTC from the Kathalapur mandal of Karimnagar District, Telangana.

Political career 
Uma took an oath in the coveted ZP chairperson position on 5 July 2014.

In June 2021, she resigned from TRS following a controversial resignation of Etela Rajender. She alleged that the party's leadership is involved in conspiracies separating them from the people of the state. On 14 June, she joined BJP.

References

Living people
People from Karimnagar
Telangana Rashtra Samithi politicians
Women in Telangana politics
21st-century Indian women politicians
21st-century Indian politicians
Bharatiya Janata Party politicians from Telangana
Year of birth missing (living people)